Shine may refer to:

Arts and entertainment

Film and television
 Shine (film), a 1996 Australian film based on the life of David Helfgott, a pianist
 Shine, a fictional character in the American animated TV series Shimmer and Shine

Literature
 Shine (Myracle novel), a 2011 novel by Lauren Myracle
 Shine, a 2013 novel by Candy Gourlay
 Shine (Jung novel), a 2020 novel by Jessica Jung

Music
 Shine!, a musical based on the works of Horatio Alger

Bands
 Shine (Hong Kong group), a Hong Kong Cantopop duo
 Shine (Scottish band), folk trio of Alyth McCormack, Corinna Hewat and Mary Macmaster

Albums
 Shine (Trey Anastasio album), 2005
 Shine, by Average White Band, 1980
 Shine, by Sarah Bettens, 2007
 Shine (Mary Black album), 1997
 Shine (Bond album), 2002
 Shine (Meredith Brooks album), 2004
 Shine (compilation series), released by Polygram from 1995 to 1998
 Shine (Crime & the City Solution album), 1988
 Shine (Edenbridge album), 2004
 Shine (Elan album), 2008
 Shine (Estelle album), 2008
 Shine (Five Star album), 1991
 Shine (Frida album), 1984
 Shine, by Illinois, 2015
 Shine (Indica album), 2014
 Shine (J-Min EP), 2014
 Shine (Boney James album), 2006
 Shine (Kids in the Kitchen album), 1985
 Shine!, by Kyuss, 1996
 Shine (Cyndi Lauper album), 2004
 Shine (Daniel Lanois album), 2003
 Shine (Mary-Jess Leaverland album), 2011
 Shine (Luna Sea album), 1998
 Shine (Martina McBride album), 2009
 Shine (Pat McGee Band album), 2000
 Shine (Joni Mitchell album), 2007
 Shine (Kevin Moore album), 2010
 Shine (Mother Love Bone EP), 1989
 Shine (Anna Nalick EP),  2008
 Shine: The Hits, by Newsboys, 2000
 Shine (Anette Olzon album), 2014
 Shine (Daniel Peixoto EP), 2011
 Shine (Shaman's Harvest album), 2009
 Shine, by Helen Slater, 2010
 Shine (Wale album), 2017
 Shine, by The Wilkinsons, 2001
 Shine, by Pentagon, 2018

Songs
 "Shine" (1910 song), a popular song with lyrics by Cecil Mack and Lew Brown and music by Ford Dabney
 "Shine" (Vanessa Amorosi song), 2000
 "Shine" (Trey Anastasio song), 2005
 "Shine" (Aswad song), 1994
 "Shine" (Camouflage song), 2015
 "Shine" (Ima Castro song), 1996
 "Shine" (Pentagon song), 2018
 "Shine" (Collective Soul song), 1993
 "Shine" (De Toppers song), 2009
 "Shine" (Five Star song), 1991
 "Shine" (Waylon Jennings song), 1981
 "Shine" (Natália Kelly song), 2013
 "Shine" (Kids in the Kitchen song), 1985
 "Shine" (Cyndi Lauper song), 2002
 "Nexus 4/Shine", by L'Arc-en-Ciel, 2008
 "Shine" (Luna Sea song), 1998
 "Shine" (Krystal Meyers song)
 "Shine" (Motörhead song), 1983
 "Shine" (Sopho Nizharadze song), 2010
 "Shine" (Shannon Noll song), 2005
 "Shine" (Mike Oldfield song), 1986
 "Shine" (Rosemary's Sons song), 2002
 "Shine" (Gwen Stefani song), 2015
 "Shine" (Take That song), 2007
 "Shine" (Tolmachevy Sisters song), 2014
 "Shine" / "Ride On", by TVXQ, 2008
 "Shine" (Luther Vandross song), 2007
 "Shine" (Years & Years song), 2015
 "Shine", by 3 Doors Down from the various artists compilation album AT&T Team USA Soundtrack
 "Shine", by Aly & AJ from Into the Rush
 "Shine", by Aminé from OnePointFive
"Shine", by B'z from Brotherhood
 "Shine", by Babymetal from Metal Galaxy
 "Shine", by Bond from Shine
 "Shine", by Meredith Brooks from Bad Bad One
 "Shine", by Jeremy Camp from Reckless
 "Shine", by Dog's Eye View from Happy Nowhere
 "Shine", by Doja Cat from Hot Pink
 "Shine", by Hilary Duff from the self-titled album
 "Shine", by Edenbridge from Shine
 "Shine", by Estelle from Shine
 "Shine", by Everclear from Welcome to the Drama Club
 "Shine", by Fear, and Loathing in Las Vegas from New Sunrise
 "Shine", by Frida from Shine, 1984
 "Shine", by Gabrielle from Under My Skin
 "Shine", by Gotthard from Firebirth
 "Shine", by David Gray from A Century Ends
 "Shine", by Ben Harper from Call It What It Is
 "Shine", by Imogen Heap from iMegaphone
 "Shine", by James from The Night Before
 "Shine", by Lil Wayne from Lights Out
 "Shine", by Ira Losco from Butterfly
 "Shine", by Lovefreekz, 2004
 "Shine", by Madrugada from Industrial Silence, 1999
 "Shine", by Ricky Martin from Música + Alma + Sexo
 "Shine", by Romeo Miller, as Romeo, from Lottery
 "Shine", by the Mighty Lemon Drops, from World Without End
 "Shine", by Mr. Big from Actual Size, used as the ending theme for the anime Hellsing
 "Shine", by Newsboys from Going Public
 "Shine", by Anna Nalick from Shine EP
 "Shine", by Josh Ostrander, as Mondo Cozmo, from Plastic Soul
 "Shine", by Paradise Lost from Paradise Lost
 "Shine", by Quavo from Quavo Huncho
 "Shine", by Riot from Army of One
 "Shine", by Royce da 5'9" from Layers
 "Shine", by The Smith Street Band from More Scared of You Than You Are of Me
 "Shine", by Soulsavers from Angels & Ghosts
 "Shine", by the Stoneman Douglas Drama Club of Marjory Stoneman Douglas High School, 2018
 "Shine", by Strapping Young Lad from Alien
 "Shine (In Your Mind)", by The Apples in Stereo from Fun Trick Noisemaker
 "Shine", by Todrick Hall from Forbidden
 "Shine", by Sevendust from Animosity

Businesses and organizations
 Shine (charity), a British charity which supports people affected by spina bifida and hydrocephalus
 Shine Distillery and Grill, in Portland, Oregon, U.S.
 Shine FM (disambiguation), the name of several radio stations
 Shine Global, an American non-profit media company 
 Shine Group, television production company
 Shine Group of Institutions, a college in Irba, Ranchi, Jharkhand, India
 Shine TV, a British media production company
 Shine TV (New Zealand), a Christian TV channel 
 Shine Lawyers, an Australian law firm 
 SHINE Medical Technologies, an American company
 Shine Wrestling, an American women's wrestling promotion
 Shine, a website for women created in 2008 by Yahoo!
 SHINE, the online brand of the Chinese English-language newspaper Shanghai Daily
 Endemol Shine Group, formerly Sine Group, a Dutch-British TV production and distribution company

People
 Shine (surname), list of people with the surname
 Shine Begho (born 1985), Nigerian media personality 
 Shine Louise Houston, an American pornographic filmmaker 
 Shine Kuk (Son Yong Kuk, born 1993), a South Korean actress in the Philippines 
 Shine (musician), a Burmese musician 
 Shine Thura (born 1996), a Burmese footballer 
 Shine Tom Chacko (born 1983), an Indian film actor
 Shines, a surname

Places
 Shine, Washington, U.S.

Other uses
 Shine (fundraising event), a British cancer charity event
 Shine (Singapore festival), a youth festival
 Shine (nightclub), in Belfast, Northern Ireland
 SHINE Awards ("Sexual Health in Entertainment"), annual media awards
 SHINE Expert System, a NASA/JPL software-development tool 
 LG Shine, a mobile phone by LG Electronics
 NA61/SHINE, a particle physics experiment
 Dance shines, moves in Salsa

See also
 
 
 Shine On (disambiguation)
 Shining (disambiguation)
 Shiny (disambiguation)
 Shyne (born 1979), a Belizean rapper
 Hyperbolic sine (abbreviated sinh, pronounced "shine"), a mathematical function
 Moonshine, a slang term for high-proof distilled spirits
 "Shine, Jesus, Shine", a 1987 Christian song
 "Shine, Perishing Republic", a poem by Robinson Jeffers, 1925
 "Shine, Shine", a song by Barry Gibb, 1984 
 Shinee, South Korean boy band